Troilus de Mesqouez (1536–1606) was a French noble (Marquis de La Roche-Helgomarche) and served as Viceroy of New France. He initiated the first attempts to settle Sable Island, a small island off the Canadian province of Nova Scotia.

Biography

de Mesqouez was born in Mesgouez en Ploumoguer to parents Guillaume de Mesgouez and Françoise Campir. He was granted the title of Viceroy of New France in 1578 by Henry III of France and around 1598 or 1599 sent settlers (mainly criminals) and soldiers to Sable Island to establish a fishery and fur trading post. Poorly planned, the settlement failed and was abandoned around 1602–1603.

Death

After returning from Sable Island he tried without success to obtain his dues from Henry IV of France. He was married twice and left no heirs upon his death.

Legacy

La Roche is a township in Bas-Saint-Laurent, Canada which was named for him some three centuries after his arrival in the area.

References

1536 births
1606 deaths
Explorers of Canada
French explorers of North America
People of New France
16th century in Canada